Frank McKenna (born 1948) is a Canadian businessman, diplomat and politician.

Frank McKenna may also refer to:

Frank McKenna (baseball) (fl. 1874), Philadelphia White Stockings player
Frank McKenna (English footballer) (1902–1947), English footballer (Grimsby Town, Fulham FC, Norwich City, Newport County)
Frank McKenna (Scottish footballer) (fl. 1920–1929), Scottish footballer who played in the American Soccer League
Frank McKenna (RAF officer) (1906–1994), British Royal Air Force service police detective